The following is a list of the presidents of Davidson College, which began operating in 1837 in Davidson, North Carolina.

{| border="2" cellpadding="4" cellspacing="0" style="margin: 1em 1em 1em 0; background: #f9f9f9; border: 1px #aaa solid; border-collapse: collapse; font-size: 95%;"
! !! Presidents of Davidson College !! Years as president
|-
| 1 || Reverend Robert Hall Morrison || 1836-1840
|-
| 2 || Reverend Samuel Williamson (academic) || 1841-1854
|-
| 3 || Reverend Drury Lacy, Jr. || 1855-1860
|-
|4|| Reverend John Lycan Kirkpatrick || 1860-1866
|-
|5|| Reverend George Wilson McPhail || 1866-1871
|-
| -|| John Rennie Blake || 1871-1877
|-
|6|| Reverend Andrew Dousa Hepburn || 1877-1885
|-
| 7 || Reverend Luther McKinnon || 1885-1888
|-
| - || Colonel William Joseph Martin || 1887–1888, Acting President
|-
| 8 || Reverend John Bunyan Shearer || 1888-1901
|-
| 9 || Henry Louis Smith || 1901-1912
|-
| 10 || William Joseph Martin, Jr. || 1912-1929
|-
| 11 || Reverend Walter Lee Lingle || 1929-1941
|-
| 12 || Dr. John Rood Cunningham || 1941-1957
|-
| - || Professor Clarence John Pietenpol || 1957–1958, Acting President
|-
| 13 || Dr. David Grier Martin || 1958-1968
|-
| - || Professor Frontis Withers Johnston || 1968, Acting President
|-
| 14 || Dr. Samuel Reid Spencer, Jr. || 1968-1983
|-
| - || Professor Frontis Withers Johnston || 1983-1984, Acting President
|-
| 15 || Dr. John Kuykendall || 1984-1997
|-
| 16 || Robert F. Vagt || 1997-2007
|-
| 17 || Thomas W. Ross || 2007-2010
|-
| - || Dr. John Kuykendall || 2010, Acting President
|-
| 18 || Dr. Carol Quillen || 2011–2022
|-
| 19 || Dr. Douglas A. Hicks || 2022-Present
|
}

Davidson College